Gárdonyi is a Hungarian surname, meaning "from (of) Gárdony". Notable people with the surname include:

Géza Gárdonyi (1863–1922), Hungarian writer and journalist
Zoltán Gárdonyi (1906–1986), Hungarian composer and musicologist
Zsolt Gárdonyi (born 1946), Hungarian composer, organist and music theorist; son of Zoltán

Hungarian-language surnames